My New Friends is the third solo release by drummer Josh Freese. The EP consisted of songs written about the people Freese met by way of the price packages on his previous release.

Track listing

References

2011 EPs
Josh Freese albums